Raj Kapoor (born 15 August 1958) is an Indian film director and actor, who has worked predominantly in Tamil cinema. He has also appeared as a supporting actor in Telugu, Malayalam and Kannada films.

Career
Raj Kapoor started his cinema career as an assistant director to Film director C. V. Sridhar one of the legends of golden period of Tamil cinema. Later became an independent film director for Thalattu Ketkuthamma (1991). He is known for films like Prabhu-Khushbu’s  Uthama Raasa (1993) and Ajith-Simran’s Aval Varuvala (1998). He went on to direct other films like Ajith-Meena's Anantha Poongatre (1999), Arjun's Sudhandhiram (2000) and Sathyaraj's Vambu Sandai (2008).

After making his debut as an actor in Thalaimurai (1998), Raj Kapoor announced his intentions of continuing to act in films ahead of prioritizing directorial work.

During the early 2000s, he worked on the production of a big-budget family drama titled Enna Vilai Azhagae with Prashanth and Amisha Patel starring. Despite completing most of the film and having schedules abroad in Paris, the film was shelved and remains unreleased.

He took to directing television serials, the most famous being Sundar C.’s Nandini, that was aired on Sun TV. He later directed a few episodes Rasaathi and Jothi.

Personal life
His son Sharook Kapoor began assisting in Raj Kapoor's film direction works. On February 17, 2020 Sharook Kapoor who was in Mecca with his mother for pilgrimage died.

Filmography

Director
Films

Serials

Actor
Films
All films are in Tamil, unless otherwise noted.

Serials

References 

Tamil film directors
Living people
20th-century Indian film directors
Film directors from Tamil Nadu
Telugu film directors
21st-century Indian film directors
1965 births
Indian television directors
Male actors in Tamil cinema
20th-century Indian male actors
Indian male film actors
Tamil television directors